'Alan Carney (born David Boughal; December 22, 1909 – May 2, 1973) was an American actor and comedian.

Biography
Alan Carney was born David Boughal in Brooklyn, New York, on December 22, 1909. His parents, Edward and Nellie (Kearney) Boughal, were Irish immigrants.

He performed in vaudeville for years. After making his first film, 1941's Convoy, Carney signed a contract at RKO Pictures and appeared in choice supporting roles in such films as Mr. Lucky.

In 1943, Carney teamed up with Wally Brown as RKO's answer to Abbott and Costello. In addition to their inexpensive starring vehicles, Brown and Carney co-starred in Step Lively, a musical remake of the Marx Brothers film Room Service. Wally played Chico's part, while Alan Carney filled in for Harpo; the "Groucho" role was essayed by George Murphy. The comedy team was also featured on a live USO tour arranged by the studio.

After 1946's Genius at Work, RKO terminated the team's contracts. Alan Carney continued in films and television as a supporting player, working prolifically at Disney Studios in the 1960s and 1970s. One of Carney's best latter-day roles was as Mayor Dawgmeat in the 1959 musical film Li'l Abner.

Carney appeared with Wally Brown in Who Was That Lady? (1960) and in Walt Disney's The Absent-Minded Professor (1961), but they never appeared in the same scenes together.  The duo was slated to be reunited for It's a Mad, Mad, Mad, Mad World (1963), but Brown died not long before filming began.
       
Alan Carney made his last film appearance in Walt Disney Productions' Herbie Rides Again, released in 1974 after his death.

He died in Van Nuys, California, of a heart attack at the age of 63 from the excitement of winning the daily double at Hollywood Park Racetrack.

Filmography 

Gildersleeve's Bad Day (1943) as Toad
Mr. Lucky (1943) as Crunk
Mexican Spitfire's Blessed Event (1943) as Navajo Room Bartender
The Adventures of a Rookie (1943) as Mike Strager
Gangway for Tomorrow (1943) as Swallow
Around the World (1943) as Joe Gimpus
Rookies in Burma (1943) as Mike Strager
Seven Days Ashore (1944) as Orval 'Handsome' Martin
Step Lively (1944) as Harry
Girl Rush (1944) as Mike Strager
Zombies on Broadway (1945) as Mike Strager
Radio Stars on Parade (1945) as Mike Strager
Genius at Work (1946) as Mike Strager
Vacation in Reno (1946) as Angel
The Pretender (1947) as Victor Korrin
Hideout (1949) as Evans
Rally 'Round the Flag, Boys! (1958) as Bartender / Owner (uncredited)
Compulsion (1959) as Globe Newspaper Editor (uncredited)
Li'l Abner (1959) as Mayor Daniel D. Dogmeat
Who Was That Lady? (1960) as Building Superintendent (uncredited)
North to Alaska (1960) as Bartender (uncredited)
Swingin' Along (1961) as Officer Sullivan
The Absent-Minded Professor (1961) as First Referee
The Comancheros (1961) as Stillwater Bartender (uncredited)
Son of Flubber (1963) as Referee
It's a Mad, Mad, Mad, Mad World (1963) as a sergeant with the Santa Rosita Police Department
Sylvia (1965) as Gus
Monkeys, Go Home! (1967) as Grocer
The Adventures of Bullwhip Griffin (1967) as Joe Turner
Blackbeard's Ghost (1968) as Bartender
Flap (1970) as Member of Circus Train (uncredited)
Wild Rovers (1971) as Palace Bartender
Herbie Rides Again (1974) as Judge with Cigar at Chicken Run (final film role)

See also
 Brown and Carney

References

External links
 
 

1909 births
1973 deaths
American male film actors
Vaudeville performers
People from Brooklyn
20th-century American male actors
RKO Pictures contract players
American male comedians